Rone is a populated area, a socken (not to be confused with parish), on the Swedish island of Gotland. It comprises the same area as the administrative Rone District, established on 1January 2016.

Geography 
Rone is the name of the socken as well as the district. It is also the name of the small village surrounding the medieval Rone Church, sometimes referred to as Rone kyrkby. It is situated in the southeast part of Gotland. The village and harbor Ronehamn is on the southeast coast of Rone.

, Rone Church belongs to Alva-Hemse-Rone parish in Sudrets pastorat, along with the churches in Alva and Hemse.

One of the asteroids in the asteroid belt, 8680 Rone, is named after this place.

History 
There are several Bronze Age cairns in Rone, including Uggarde rojr, the largest cairn on Gotland. Another one is Lejstu rojr, which is also an area of cairns, walls and grave fields. Two of the asteroids in the asteroid belt, 10807 Uggarde and 10810 Lejsturojr, are named after these cairns.

Rojr, roir and rör are Gutnish words for cairn.

References

External links 

Objects from Rone at the Digital Museum by Nordic Museum

Populated places in Gotland County